Aled Williams may refer to:
 Aled Williams (footballer)
 Aled Williams (rugby union)